Juventud en Éxtasis is the second full-length album from Mexico's Maria Daniela y su Sonido Lasser. It was released in November 2007.

Track listing 

Pecadora Normal
Pobre Estúpida
Yo Asesiné A Mi Novio
Tu Sombra
Es Mejor Así
Qué Vas A Hacerme
Dame Más
Pinta Un Bosque
Amor Fugaz
100 X Hora
Duri Duri
Drop The Chalupa (Bonus Track)
Juventud en Extasis

External links 
Myspace Site
Official Fansite
Nuevos Ricos

2007 albums